The 31st New Brunswick Legislative Assembly represented New Brunswick between March 26, 1903, and January 23, 1908.

Jabez Bunting Snowball served as Lieutenant-Governor of New Brunswick until March 1907 when he was succeeded by Lemuel John Tweedie.

C.W. Robinson was chosen as speaker. Charles J. Osman was selected as speaker in 1907 after Robinson became premier for the province.

The Liberal Party led by Lemuel John Tweedie formed the government. William Pugsley became party leader in 1907 when Tweedie became lieutenant governor. Clifford William Robinson succeeded Pugsley later that year when Pugsley entered federal politics.

History

Members 

Notes:

References 
 Canadian Parliamentary Guide, 1903, AJ Magurn

Terms of the New Brunswick Legislature
1903 establishments in New Brunswick
1908 disestablishments in New Brunswick
20th century in New Brunswick